Raduńskie Lake (or Raduńskie Lakes, divided into Upper and Lower) - a ribbon lake located in the Kashubian Lake District, in the Kartuzy County (Pomeranian Voivodeship), part of the Kashubian Landscape Park. The lake is formed in a post-glacial valley, through which the River Radunia flows through. The lake is located in a region known as the Kashubian Switzerland (Szwajcaria Kaszubska).

References

Lakes of Pomeranian Voivodeship